Wiedensahl is a municipality in the district of Schaumburg, in Lower Saxony, Germany.

The caricaturist, painter and poet Wilhelm Busch was born here in 1832.

References

Municipalities in Lower Saxony
Schaumburg